Conair of Scandinavia A/S was a Danish charter airline which operated between 1965 and 1993. Established by Simon Spies, it originally had a fleet of Douglas DC-7 aircraft, taken over from Flying Enterprise.

From about 1970, the airline replaced its fleet with Boeing 720 aircraft, bought from Eastern. From around 1979 these were replaced by the stronger engine version Boeing 720B. It bought second-hand Airbus A300 in 1987, and in 1991 six new Airbus A320. The airline was based at Copenhagen Airport. In 1993, it merged with Scanair to establish  Premiair, today Thomas Cook Airlines Scandinavia which still has its base at Copenhagen Kastrup Airport, EKCH/CPH.

History
Conair was founded by the Scandinavian charter pioneer Simon Spies in 1965. The fleet was from scratch old Douglas DC-7 propeller aircraft, which was taken over from Flying Enterprise.  Around 1970 Conair got in to the "jet age", and bought second-hand Boeing 720s instead. (Boeing 720 was a mid-distance version of the Boeing 707). In autumn of 1987, two Conair Boeing 720s had their nose gear cracked during otherwise normal landings in Salzburg, Austria and Rome, Italy. The fleet was already set to be renewed to (also second-hand) Airbus A300s. But after the two incidents the changing of the fleet became a very urgent issue.

After the death of Simon Spies, his rather new wife and former secretary Janni Spies (born Brodersen, some 40 years younger than the founder himself) got ahead of the whole Spies corporation (where the traveling agency Spies rejser was included) and she employed her brother, a former carpenter, as general manager.

They soon ordered six new very expensive Airbus A320s at the same time as the Gulf War occurred. In the aftermath of the war, a sudden drop in numbers of flight passenger worldwide was a factor (which among other things) led to the bankruptcy of Pan Am.
Conair and the Spies traveling agency were saved (almost as a Danish national treasure due to the huge popularity for the former "charter-king", the deceased Simon Spies) by banks, and Janni Spies and her staff were replaced. In 1993 Conair merged with a Swedish charter airline company, Scanair, into Premiair. Later the name was changed to My Travel. Today it is known as Thomas Cook Airlines Scandinavia, still having its base at Copenhagen Airport.

Conair primarily flew tourists from the Spies traveling agency, but also served several other travel agencies. The vast majority of flights had their destinations in the Mediterranean area but also at Canary Islands, Gambia, London, Rome and Paris. Beside their main base at Copenhagen, flights also departed from Billund Airport and Stockholm, Sweden.

Defunct airlines of Denmark
Airlines established in 1965
Airlines disestablished in 1993
1965 establishments in Denmark
1993 disestablishments in Denmark